The BMW i4 (model code G26) is a battery electric compact executive car produced by BMW since 2021. It adopts a five-door liftback body style and is marketed as a four-door coupé. The initial concept version, named BMW i Vision Dynamics, debuted at the 2017 Frankfurt Motor Show. It is the fifth BMW i sub-brand model, and is sold in several variants at different performance levels, including the first battery-electric variant by BMW's motorsport division. The production version was revealed in March 2021 and went on sale in November 2021.

Development and launch
While 90% of the existing production equipment in the body shop were incorporated into the production process of the i4, several new systems were required mainly for the floor assembly and rear structure as the electric drive and high-voltage battery are different from conventional architectures. The plant was closed for six weeks in the summer of 2020 to convert more than 1000 robots in the body shop and assembly area to prepare it for the assembly of the i4. The electric motor is assembled in Dingolfing. The i4 was revealed fully production-ready in March 2021, three months ahead of schedule, and went on sale in November 2021.

Furthermore, BMW enhanced the sustainability of its supply chain and increased its use of recycled materials for the i4, cutting the production emissions by 18 percent.

Specifications

Body and chassis 

The production model is based on the modular CLAR platform to keep costs low and volume-production attainable. Although it is described as a battery-powered G20 3 Series, the model uses the bodyshell design of the G26 4 Series Gran Coupé. The i4 has a MacPherson strut front suspension and multi-link rear suspension with rear air suspension as standard (the M50 adds adaptive M dampers). It has a damping system designed to reduce “dipping movements of the body” under acceleration or braking, with an “actuator-related wheel slip limitation” system to better boost traction and stability.

The i4 has an almost completely flat underbody, resulting in a low drag coefficient of 0.24 for the eDrive40 and 0.25 for the M50. Compared to the G20 3 Series, it has  wider front tracks and  wider rear tracks. Due to the low floor location of the battery pack for better agility, the M50's center of gravity is  lower than the G20 3 Series and  lower in the eDrive40. An active air flap control at the bottom of the grille can be adjusted in ten stages, allowing cooling air to be supplied to the drive system, battery, brakes, and air conditioning system in precise quantities. The eDrive40 has a 45:55 weight distribution, while it is 48:52 for the M50.

Powertrain 
The electric drive component of the i4, its charging unit and high-voltage battery are all developed in-house by the BMW Group, forming the fifth-generation eDrive system. A notable technical feature of the i4's powertrain concerns its packaging. The electric motor, transmission and power electronics are all contained in a single component, which allows for a higher efficiency of energy conversion. BMW also focussed on reducing the number of rare earth materials in the battery and electric motor system. None are used to construct the motor (efficiency factor of 93 percent), while the battery uses two thirds less cobalt than before. The motors themselves are positioned in the axles, and the axles also house the one-speed transmissions.

The M50 can recuperate braking energy at a max rate of 195 kW and 116 kW for the eDrive40. The three adjustable regenerative braking levels includes a robust setting for one-pedal driving, while the fourth adaptive mode uses GPS data and driver-assistance systems to adjust the amount of regenerative braking. The eDrive40 is a rear-wheel drive model, where power comes from a single  electrically excited synchronous motor that is fitted to the rear axle. The M50 runs predominantly in rear-wheel drive mode, conserving energy and thus increasing range. The larger  electric motor resides at the rear, while the smaller  only kicks in when the front tires require power. Using a pre-warmed battery, consumption can be 20kWh/100 km driving in winter mountains.

Battery 
The battery enclosure is directly connected to the front axle subframe, while the battery pack is bolted to the floor assembly with 22 bolts. There also is an additional section of the battery housed within the center tunnel in the place usually taken up by a driveshaft. The battery voltage is between 400 volt (empty) and 477 volt (full), with a nominal voltage of 430 volt. The i4's battery has 40 percent more energy density than the 120 Ah version of the BMW i3.

The fifth-generation eDrive system supports up to 200 kW DC fast charging. Using a Level 2 wall box with AC power and a charging rate of 11 kW, the i4 can recharge its battery from 0–100 percent in under eight hours.

The i4 features an integrated heating and cooling system that takes into account various factors such as ambient temperature and mid-journey fast-charging sessions to precondition the temperature of the battery pack. It does this automatically via high efficiency pumps that can increase range efficiency by up to 31 percent when driving in urban traffic. Without pre-warming, the battery may be restricted to 75 kW charging at cold temperatures.

Equipment 

All models feature the iDrive 8 infotainment system, including an updated voice-controlled assistant and gesture control system, while the iDrive controller is also retained on the centre console. The interface is sourced through the BMW Curved Display that combines the  instrument cluster and  infotainment system with a redesigned touch interface within a single unit. The iDrive 8 system features Apple CarPlay and Android Auto capability, compatible with 5G mobile technology, while third-party applications for communication and music streaming are also integrated within the system. The over-the-air functionality is increased and incorporate updates to driving functions, such as driving assistance and semi-autonomous features. A number of ambient lighting elements are placed throughout the cabin and change color depending on the driving mode. The iDrive 8 system is integrated with the new My BMW App for smartphones.

Standard equipment includes a sports steering wheel with multifunction buttons and sports seats, three-zone climate control, acoustic glazing for the windshield, pre-heating and pre-conditioning, and an electrically operated tailgate. Optional equipment includes such as seat heating and ventilation, M Sport Package Pro, ambient lighting and a glass slide/tilt sunroof. An M Carbon exterior package and M Performance Parts can also be ordered as an option. The i4 offer a 10-speaker audio system with a 205-Watt amplifier as standard, while a Harman Kardon system with 16 speakers with a digital seven-channel amplifier is an optional equipment. Full LED headlights and tail lights are standard, though the former can be upgraded to adaptive units with BMW Laserlight and BMW Selective Beam function. It is available in wheel sizes from 17 inch to 20 inch with wider rear tires as standard.

Furthermore, it has up to 40 driver assistance systems, enabling Level 2 semi autonomous driving. Standard driver assistance systems including lane departure warning, intelligent speed adaptation, collision warning with braking intervention, front and rear parking sensors, and a backup camera. A Driving Assistance Professional package is optional, which adds adaptive cruise control with stop and go, lane-keep assist with side collision avoidance, and rear automatic emergency braking. The optional parking assistant system displays a three-dimensional 360 degree view of the car and its surroundings.

M Performance parts can be fitted 35-40 models in the M Sport Trim and all M50 models. These include carbon fibre mirrors, spoiler, kidney grille trim, splitter, diffuser, rear bumper trim, front vents and gear lever, M rims, interior alcantara, a sport steering wheel and sport seats.

Models 
Models introduced at launch include the high-performance M50 with a dual-motor xDrive all-wheel system, the first battery-electric vehicle by BMW's motorsport division, and eDrive40 with a single-motor, rear-wheel-drive layout. The base RWD model eDrive35, featuring the same battery and electric motor as the China-exclusive BMW i3, was added in August 2022.

Safety

Euro NCAP
The i4 in its standard European configuration received 4 stars from Euro NCAP in 2022.

Reviews and reception 
In December 2022, Bloomberg named the i4 as an ideal replacement for Tesla's Model 3 for individuals upset with Elon Musk.

Concept cars 
The BMW i4 was previewed by two concept cars: BMW i Vision Dynamics (2017) and BMW Concept i4 (2020), as well as the Vision Next 100 (2016).

BMW i Vision Dynamics (2017) 

The initial BMW i Vision Dynamics concept debuted at the 2017 Frankfurt Motor Show, and was built on the flexible CLAR platform rather than a carbon-fibre structure as with the contemporary i3 and i8 electric models. The i Vision Dynamics concept gave a hint at BMW's intention to make a mid-sized EV four-door coupé. It was powered by a single electric motor on the rear axle. The design of the i Vision Dynamics was based on the study Vision Next 100 from 2016.

Although the interior was not finished, BMW promised a great view outwards via the "flush integration of glass into the main body". Controversially, the i Vision Dynamics featured a reworking of the double-kidney grille that covered a plethora of sensors. Depending on the legal environment, BMW intimated that the goal was to launch the production car with the capability to work at Level 3 or Level 4 autonomous driving, which require differing types of human input depending on circumstances.

The production version was announced at the 2018 Geneva Motor Show as the BMW i4. At the 2018 Paris Motor Show, BMW confirmed the launch year for the i4 as being 2021.

The headlight design was introduced in 2022 on the G70 7 Series and the facelifted G07 X7, while the rear light design was adopted in 2019 on the F44 2 Series Gran Coupé and G06 X6.

BMW Concept i4 (2020) 
The BMW Concept i4 was presented in March 2020 and reiterated a lot of i4's specifications that was shared at the LA Auto Show in November 2019. The design language of the Concept i4 was more closely resembled to the production model than the i Vision Dynamics, and confirmed the i4 as an all-electric version of the G26 4 Series Gran Coupé. The single rear-motor was projected to be rated at  that was on par with one of BMW's V8 combustion engines, though media doubted this claim as V8's are connected to a xDrive system. The proportions were classic coupé, featuring a long wheelbase, fastback roofline and short overhangs. The exterior design had been kept simple with its smooth lines and clear surfaces "as a deliberate counterpoint to the dynamic flair of the driving experience". The covered kidney grille served primarily as an "intelligence panel" housing the various sensors for autonomous driving.

The concept featured a stretched wheelbase with BMW claiming it would offer plenty of cabin space. The highly futuristic and minimalistic interior was dominated by the BMW Curved Display that was angled toward the driver, featuring the newest BMW Operating System 8. Other notable features was an all-glass roof, mixture of cloth and leather in the seats and dash with bronze and chrome fixtures, and replacement of touchpoints with crystal-like plastic.

References

External links
 BMW i Vision Dynamics press release
 BMW i Vision Dynamics UK website 

i4
Cars introduced in 2021
Compact executive cars
Sports sedans
Hatchbacks
Rear-wheel-drive vehicles
All-wheel-drive vehicles
Production electric cars
Euro NCAP large family cars